The 26th South American Junior Championships in Athletics were held in Santa Fe, Argentina from September 1–4, 1994.

Participation (unofficial)

Detailed result lists can be found on the "World Junior Athletics History" website.  An unofficial count yields the number of about 259 athletes from about 12 countries:  Argentina (50), Bolivia (7), Brazil (61), Chile (41), Colombia (15), Ecuador (17), Guyana (2), Panama (2), Paraguay (19), Peru (11), Uruguay (31), Venezuela (3).

Medal summary
Medal winners are published for men and women
Complete results can be found on the "World Junior Athletics History" website.

Men

Women

Medal table (unofficial)

References

External links
World Junior Athletics History

South American U20 Championships in Athletics
1994 in Argentine sport
South American U20 Championships
International athletics competitions hosted by Argentina
1994 in South American sport
1994 in youth sport
September 1994 sports events in South America